Reuss-Ebersdorf was a county and from 1806 a principality located in Germany. The Counts of Reuss-Ebersdorf belonged to the Reuss Junior Line. Reuss was successively a part of the Holy Roman Empire, Confederation of the Rhine, German Confederation, North German Confederation, German Empire and Weimar Republic before becoming a part of Thuringia in 1920.

History 
Following the death of Count Heinrich X of Reuss-Lobenstein in 1671, Reuss-Lobenstein was ruled jointly by his three sons Heinrich III, Heinrich VIII and Heinrich X. In 1678 Reuss-Lobenstein was partitioned with Heinrich III remaining Count of Reuss-Lobenstein, Heinrich VIII becoming Count of Reuss-Hirschberg and Heinrich X becoming the Count of Reuss-Ebersdorf.

In 1806 the title of the ruler of Reuss-Ebersdorf was upgraded to that of Prince. In 1824, on the death of Prince Heinrich LIV of Reuss-Lobenstein, Count Heinrich LXXII of Reuss-Ebersdorf succeeded him and took the title Prince of Reuss-Lobenstein-Ebersdorf. Prince Heinrich LXXII remained prince of Reuss-Lobenstein-Ebersdorf until his abdication in 1848 in favour of the prince of Reuss-Schleiz.

Count Heinrich XXIV was the father of Countess Augusta Reuss-Ebersdorf, maternal grandmother of Queen Victoria of the United Kingdom.

Rulers of Reuss-Ebersdorf

Counts of Reuss-Ebersdorf (1678–1806) 
 Heinrich X, 1678–1711
 Heinrich XXIX, 1711–47
 Heinrich XXIV, 1747–79
 Heinrich LI, 1779–1806
Raised to principality, 1806

Princes of Reuss-Ebersdorf (1806–24) 
 Heinrich LI, 1806–22
 Heinrich LXXII, 1822–24
Succeeded as Prince Reuss of Lobenstein and Ebersdorf, 1824

Princes of Reuss-Lobenstein-Ebersdorf (1824–48) 
 Heinrich LXXII, 1824–48
To Reuss-Schleiz, 1848

1678 establishments in the Holy Roman Empire
1824 disestablishments in Germany
States and territories established in 1678
Former states and territories of Thuringia
States of the German Confederation
Upper Saxon Circle
Eberstein